Jacob Carl Schindler (born September 25, 1989) is an American professional poker player from Bryn Mawr, Pennsylvania known for his accomplishments in live and online poker tournaments.

Early life
Schindler was raised in Bryn Mawr, Pennsylvania.

Poker career
Schindler began playing live tournaments in 2009. Schindler plays online on PokerStars poker under the alias CaLLitARUSH. In September 2013, he won the World Championship of Online Poker earning nearly $150,000.

His first success at the World Series of Poker was in 2011 where he cashed in the $5,000 No Limit Hold'em - Six Handed and the $1,000 No Limit Hold'em events. In August 2018, Schindler won the SHRPO High Roller for $800,758, defeating Shaun Deeb heads up. Later that year Schindler WPT Five Diamond 100k event, winning $1,332,000 in the process. In 2018, he made 31 final tables, the record for the year, beating Stephen Chidwick who made 26. His success in 2018 earned him the Card Player Player of the Year Award.

As of 2018, Schindler has won over $23,000,000 from live poker tournaments. He is the all-time money leader in Pennsylvania.

References

External links
 Jake Schindler Hendon Mob profile

1989 births
American poker players
Living people
People from Bryn Mawr, Pennsylvania